Andreja is a given name. Notable people with the name include:

Andreja Apostolović (born 1996), Serbian football midfielder
Andreja Efremov (born 1992), Macedonian footballer
Andreja Gomboc (born 1969), Slovenian astrophysicist
Andreja Katič (born 1969), Minister of Justice of the Republic of Slovenia
Andreja Klepač (born 1986), professional Slovenian tennis player
Andreja Koblar (née Grašič), (born 1971), former Slovenian biathlete
Andreja Kojić (1896–1952), Serbian footballer
Andreja Krsmanović (born 2003), Serbian basketball player
Andreja Kulunčić (born 1968), Croatian artist, living and working in Zagreb, Croatia
Andreja Lazović (born 1994), Serbian footballer
Andreja Leskovšek (born 1965), Slovenian former Olympic alpine skier
Andreja Mali (born 1977), former Slovenian biathlete and former cross-country skier
Andreja Marinković (born 1965), Serbian athlete
Andreja Milutinović (born 1990), Serbian professional basketball player
Andreja Mladenović (born 1975), politician in Serbia
Andreja Mrnjavčević, 14th-century Serbian noble who governed the region of Prilep 1371–1395
Andreja Nikl (born 1985), Slovenian football defender
Andreja Pejić (born 1991), Bosnian-Australian model
Andreja Preger (1912–2015), Austro-Hungarian-born pianist & Holocaust survivor
Andreja Smrekar (born 1967), Slovenian cross-country skier
Andreja Stevanović (born 1995), Serbian professional basketball player

See also
Gymnázium Andreja Vrábla Levice, gymnasium located in Levice, Slovakia
Gymnazium Andreja Vrabla, gymnasium located in Levice, Slovakia
Andrey
Andrea
Andrija

Serbian masculine given names
Slovene feminine given names